Arberry may refer to:

 Arberry (shrub), three species of dwarf shrubs
 Arthur John Arberry (1905–1969), British scholar of Islam